Joan Fisher (born 26 September 1949) is a Canadian sprinter. She competed in the women's 400 metres at the 1968 Summer Olympics. She was in the first induction of the Lisgar Collegiate Institute Athletic Wall of Fame, as part of the 160th Anniversary celebrations.

References

External links
 

1949 births
Living people
Athletes (track and field) at the 1968 Summer Olympics
Canadian female sprinters
Olympic track and field athletes of Canada
Athletes from Ottawa
Lisgar Collegiate Institute alumni
Olympic female sprinters